Litoporus lopez is a cellar spider species found in Colombia.

See also 
 List of Pholcidae species

References 

Arthropods of Colombia
Pholcidae
Spiders of South America
Spiders described in 2000